George de Rue Meiklejohn (August 26, 1857 – April 19, 1929) was an American politician who served as the fifth lieutenant governor of Nebraska under Governor John Milton Thayer and a member of the United States House of Representatives for Nebraska. He was the United States Assistant Secretary of War from 1897 to 1901.

Early life and education
de Rue Meiklejohn was born in Weyauwega, Wisconsin, on August 26, 1857. He went to the state normal school in Oshkosh, Wisconsin (now University of Wisconsin–Oshkosh).

Career
He became a principal of high schools in Weyauwega and Liscomb, Iowa. After graduating from the University of Michigan Law School in Ann Arbor, Michigan, in 1880, he was admitted to the bar and established a practice in Fullerton, Nebraska. He was the prosecuting attorney for Nance County, Nebraska, from 1881 to 1884.

In 1884 Meiklejohn was elected a member of the Nebraska Legislature, serving from 1884 to 1888. In 1886, he became president of the Senate, in 1887 the chairman of the Republican State convention, and in 1887 and 1888 chairman of the Republican State central committee. In 1889 he became the Lieutenant Governor of Nebraska and served until 1891. He was elected as a Republican to the 53rd and 54th Congresses (March 4, 1893 – March 3, 1897), but did not run for re-election in 1896. On April 14, 1897, U.S. President William McKinley appointed him the Assistant Secretary of War and he served through the Spanish–American War until March 1901.

Meiklejohn ran unsuccessfully for election to the United States Senate from Nebraska in 1901 to fill the seat of Monroe Hayward. After that, he resumed his law practice in Omaha, Nebraska, moving to Los Angeles, California, in 1918, where he practiced law and mining.

Personal life
He died in poverty at the Los Angeles County General Hospital in Los Angeles, California, on April 19, 1929. He was buried in Forest Lawn Cemetery in Glendale, California.

References

Further reading

 

1857 births
1929 deaths
People from Weyauwega, Wisconsin
Lieutenant Governors of Nebraska
Nebraska state senators
District attorneys in Nebraska
University of Wisconsin–Oshkosh alumni
University of Michigan Law School alumni
California Republicans
Republican Party members of the United States House of Representatives from Nebraska
United States Assistant Secretaries of War
People from Nance County, Nebraska
19th-century American lawyers